The Ningbo–Taizhou–Wenzhou railway or Yong-Tai-Wen railway is a dual-track, electrified, high-speed rail line in Zhejiang Province, China. It is named after the three prefecture-level cities along route: Ningbo, whose abbreviated Chinese name is Yong, Taizhou and Wenzhou. Construction began in October 2005, and the line opened to commercial service on September 28, 2009. Trains running on the line reach top speeds of 250 kilometres per hour, and the shortest trip between Ningbo and Wenzhou takes 1 hour 12 minutes.

Route
The Ningbo–Taizhou–Wenzhou railway follows the rugged but prosperous coast of Zhejiang.  Major cities and counties along route include Fenghua, Ninghai, Sanmen, Linhai, Taizhou, Huangyan, Luqiao, Wenling, Yueqing, Yongjia, and Ouhai. At Ningbo, the line joins the Xiaoshan–Ningbo railway and the Hangzhou–Ningbo passenger-dedicated line. At Wenzhou, the line joins the Wenzhou–Fuzhou railway.

History
The Ningbo–Taizhou–Wenzhou railway is the first railway to be built on the east coast of Zhejiang. Most high-speed rail lines in China follow the routes of older conventional railroads, but there were no railways on the southeast coast prior to the building of high-speed rail.  Historically, the southeast coastal region relied on maritime transportation, and rugged terrain made railway construction more expensive.  In the first half of the 20th century, warfare and political instability delayed railway construction.  During the Cold War, the southeast coast faced the threat of invasion from Republic of China on Taiwan and all railways were built inland.  Only when political tensions across the Taiwan Strait eased in the late 1990s did planning of the Yongtaiwen Line proceed.  
Construction began commenced in 2005 and track-laying was completed on May 15, 2009.  Commercial service began on September 28, 2009.

Accident

On 23 July 2011, CRH train D3115, running from Hangzhou to Fuzhou South came to a halt over a viaduct near Wenzhou South after losing its power. Shortly afterwards, CRH train D301, running from Beijing South to Fuzhou, rear-ended the stationary D3115. The accident led to 35 deaths and 211 injured, raising concerns about the safety of the fast-expanding high-speed railway network of China.

Rail connections
Ningbo: Xiaoshan–Ningbo railway
Wenzhou: Wenzhou–Fuzhou railway, Jinhua–Wenzhou railway

See also

 List of railways in China

References

Railway lines in China
Rail transport in Zhejiang
Transport in Ningbo
Taizhou, Zhejiang
Transport in Wenzhou